Andrés Gómez Santos (born 27 February 1960) is an Ecuadorian former professional tennis player. He won the men's singles title at the French Open in 1990.

His son, Emilio Gómez, is a professional tennis player. His nephew Nicolás Lapentti was also a professional tennis player who reached a world ranking of No. 6, and another nephew, Roberto Quiroz, is currently pursuing a career in professional tennis.

Career
Gómez turned professional in 1979. Early success in his career came mainly in doubles competition. He won five doubles titles in 1980, and seven in 1981.

In 1986, Gómez attained the world No. 1 doubles ranking. He won seven doubles events that year, including the US Open men's doubles title (partnering Slobodan Živojinović). Gómez won a second Grand Slam men's doubles title in 1988 at the French Open (partnering Emilio Sánchez).

His first top-level singles title came in 1981 in Bordeaux. He then won the Italian Open in 1982, beating Eliot Teltscher in the final in three sets, and again in 1984, when he defeated Aaron Krickstein in four sets.

In 1990, Gómez reached his first and only Grand Slam singles final at the French Open. He beat Fernando Luna, Marcelo Filippini, Alexander Volkov, Magnus Gustafsson, Thierry Champion and Thomas Muster to reach the final. There he faced 20-year-old Andre Agassi who, like Gómez, was playing in his first Grand Slam singles final. The up-and-coming American star was considered the favourite, but Gómez seized the moment and claimed the title with a four-set win. Gómez reached his career-high singles ranking of world No. 4 later that year.

Over the course of his career, Gómez won 21 singles and 33 doubles titles. His last singles title was won in 1991 in Brasília. His final doubles title came in 1992 in Barcelona.

Grand Slam finals

Singles: 1 (1–0)

Doubles: 2 (2–0)

Career finals

Singles: 35 (21–14)

Doubles: 51 (33–18)

Performance timelines

Singles

Doubles

Notes

References

External links
 
 
 

1960 births
Living people
Ecuadorian male tennis players
French Open champions
Sportspeople from Guayaquil
Tennis players at the 1979 Pan American Games
Pan American Games bronze medalists for Ecuador
US Open (tennis) champions
Grand Slam (tennis) champions in men's singles
Grand Slam (tennis) champions in men's doubles
Pan American Games medalists in tennis
South American Games gold medalists for Ecuador
South American Games medalists in tennis
Competitors at the 1978 Southern Cross Games
Medalists at the 1979 Pan American Games
ATP number 1 ranked doubles tennis players